Victor Cole (born January 23, 1968) is a former professional baseball pitcher. Cole is the only Major League Baseball player ever to have been born in the Soviet Union, and the ninth to have been born in what is now Russia. 

Cole pitched in eight games for the 1992 Pittsburgh Pirates, with an 0–2 record, 12 strikeouts and allowing 14 earned runs.

Cole attended Santa Clara University in California. Cole's father, from Sierra Leone, studied medicine in Russia and married a Russian woman. The family left Russia when Cole was four years old, lived in Sierra Leone for four years, then spent two years in Canada before moving to the United States when he was ten years old.

Cole was taken by the Kansas City Royals in the 14th round of the 1988 amateur draft. He was traded to the Pirates May 3, 1991 for Carmelo Martinez.

Cole played in the Milwaukee Brewers organization in 1994 and the San Diego Padres organization in 1995 and 1996. He announced his retirement during the 1995 season.

He then went to play in the Taiwan Major League for Kaoping Fala in 1997. Cole returned to the minors in 1998 and 1999 with the Chicago Cubs. He spent 2000 with the Memphis Redbirds, a AAA affiliate of the St. Louis Cardinals and SK Wyverns of the Korea Baseball Organization. Cole spent 2001 and 2002 with the KBO's Doosan Bears before retiring.  In his ten seasons in the minor leagues, he had a record of 37 - 36 with an ERA of 3.70.

In 2003, Cole joined the Russia national baseball team. He also joined the team on its tour of the North American-based independent Northeast League. Cole later coached with the National Team in the 2020 European Championships, in Group B.

References

External links

Pura Pelota (Venezuelan Winter League)
CPC Baseball trivia
New York Times mention

1968 births
Living people
Acereros de Monclova players
Águilas del Zulia players
Baseball City Royals players
Buffalo Bisons (minor league) players
Carolina Mudcats players
Doosan Bears players
El Paso Diablos players
Eugene Emeralds players
Expatriate baseball players in South Korea
Iowa Cubs players
Las Vegas Stars (baseball) players
Major League Baseball pitchers
Major League Baseball players from Russia
Memphis Chicks players
Memphis Redbirds players
New Orleans Zephyrs players
Omaha Royals players
Pine Bluff Locomotives players
Pittsburgh Pirates players
Russian people of Sierra Leonean descent
Salinas Peppers players
SSG Landers players
Sportspeople from Saint Petersburg
Sultanes de Monterrey players
Tiburones de La Guaira players
West Tennessee Diamond Jaxx players
Russian baseball players
Expatriate baseball players in Venezuela
Russian expatriate sportspeople in South Korea
Russian expatriate sportspeople in Mexico
Expatriate baseball players in Mexico
Soviet emigrants to the United States
Sierra Leonean emigrants to the United States
Expatriate baseball players in Taiwan
Sierra Leonean emigrants to Canada